William or Guillaume Barlais was a Lord of Beirut in the Kingdom of Jerusalem, via his marriage to Isabella of Beirut in 1277 - he was her fourth and final husband. They died childless and she had no children from her previous three marriages to Hugh II of Cyprus, Hamo le Strange and Nicolas l’Aleman - the Lordship of Beirut thus passed to her sister Eschiva of Ibelin and her husband Humphrey of Montfort, Lord of Tyre.

Life
His lineage is unknown, although he may be identifiable with the William Barlais who was son of Amalrich Barlais. After Isabella's death, he remarried to Alice, daughter of William of Mandelée, Lord of Scandaleon - on William Barlais' death, Alice remarried to Ague of Bethsan.

References

Bibliography 
 Europäische Stammtafeln, Band III, Tafel 564, 631
 Charles du Cange: Les Familles d'outre-mer. Publiées par Emmanuel Guillaume-Rey. Imprimerie Impériale, Paris 1869.

External links 
 Guillaume Barlais on fmg.ac

14th-century deaths
13th-century births
Christians of the Crusades